Nataliya Feklisova (born 10 October 1974) is a Ukrainian sprint canoeist who competed from the mid-1990s to the early 2000s (decade). She won a bronze medal in the K-4 1000 m event at the 2001 ICF Canoe Sprint World Championships in Poznań.

Feklisova also competed in two Summer Olympics, earning her best finish of fifth in the K-4 500 m event at Sydney in 2000.

References

Sports-reference.com profile

1974 births
Canoeists at the 1996 Summer Olympics
Canoeists at the 2000 Summer Olympics
Living people
Olympic canoeists of Ukraine
Ukrainian female canoeists
ICF Canoe Sprint World Championships medalists in kayak
21st-century Ukrainian women